"It's a Great Day to Be Alive" is a song written by Darrell Scott. It was originally recorded by American country music artist Jon Randall, of whose version was to have been included on an album titled Great Day to Be Alive, which would have been released in the late 1990s via BNA Records.  Scott released his own version of his song on his 1997 album Aloha from Nashville.

The song was also recorded by The Sky Kings, an American country-rock supergroup consisting of Bill Lloyd (Foster & Lloyd), Rusty Young (Poco), and John Cowan (New Grass Revival) around 1995/1996. Their version sat unreleased until Rhino Handmade released the compilation "From Out Of The Blue" in 2000.

The song was later covered more famously by American country music artist Travis Tritt. It was released in December 2000 as the second single from his album Down the Road I Go. It peaked at number 2 on the U.S. Billboard Hot Country Singles & Tracks chart and at number 33 on the U.S. Billboard Hot 100 chart.

It was subsequently covered by Pat Green and Cory Morrow on their March 2001 album Songs We Wish We'd Written and by Niko Moon for his 2021 album Good Time.

Critical reception
Deborah Evans Price, of Billboard magazine in her review of the album, called the song a "what-the-hell anthem" and a "sunny single."

Music video
The music video is a live performance directed by Jon Small, and begins with Travis Tritt performing the end of his 1992 cover of Elvis Presley's 1975 hit "T-R-O-U-B-L-E". It shows him performing the song to a packed crowd, with occasional cut-aways to Travis performing some of his daily routines (such as riding horseback and cruising on his Harley Davidson motorcycle.) It ends with the crowd singing the song's hook back to him, which he applauds. It was released in early January 2001. The video was recorded at the Historic Tennessee Theatre in Knoxville, Tennessee.

Chart positions
"It's a Great Day to Be Alive" debuted at number 59 on the U.S. Billboard Hot Country Singles & Tracks for the week of December 16, 2000.

Weekly charts

Year-end charts

Covers
In 2015, the song was covered by Country and Irish artist Lee Matthews with an accompanying music video released in September 2015.

Parodies
American country music parody artist Cledus T. Judd released a parody of "It's A Great Day to Be Alive" titled "It's A Great Day to Be a Guy" on his 2002 album Cledus Envy.

References

2000 singles
2000 songs
Travis Tritt songs
Pat Green songs
Jon Randall songs
Niko Moon songs
Songs written by Darrell Scott
Song recordings produced by Billy Joe Walker Jr.
Columbia Records singles